The MRWA B class was a class of steam locomotives built by Hawthorn Leslie in Tyneside, England, for the Midland Railway of Western Australia (MRWA).  The class's wheel arrangement was 4-4-0.

Service history 
The nine members of the B class entered service in 1891. Withdrawals began in 1929, but the five longest serving units continued working on the MRWA, mainly as shunting engines, from then until the 1950s.

Preservation 
One B class locomotive, no B6, has been preserved.  It is the only ex-MRWA steam locomotive still in existence.  After being withdrawn by the MRWA in 1956, B6 was acquired by the then municipality of Geraldton, and put on display in a Geraldton park.

In 1995, ownership of B6 was transferred to the then Shire of Swan, and in 1999 the locomotive was moved to the former Midland Railway Workshops, for storage in the custody of Rail Heritage WA.

In 2010, following a renewal of interest by the City of Geraldton-Greenough in rail history, B6 was moved back to the Geraldton area, for intended eventual display at a proposed railway museum at Walkaway.

See also 
 List of Western Australian locomotive classes
 Locomotives of the Western Australian Government Railways

References

External links

4-4-0 locomotives
Hawthorn Leslie and Company locomotives
Railway locomotives introduced in 1891
B class
Locomotives of the Midland Railway of Western Australia
3 ft 6 in gauge locomotives of Australia
Scrapped locomotives
Passenger locomotives